The Sky Ride was an attraction built for the Century of Progress 1933  World's Fair in Chicago, Illinois.  It was a transporter bridge (with a design similar to an aerial tramway or gondola lift) designed by the bridge engineering firm Robinson & Steinman that ferried people across the lagoon, Burnham Harbor, in the center of the fair. It was located near Northerly Island, but was demolished after the Fair, having carried 4.5 million passengers. The Sky Ride had a 1,850-foot (564 m) span and two 628-feet (191 m) tall towers, making it the most prominent structure at the fair. Suspended from the span, 215 feet (66 m) above the ground, were rocket-shaped cars, each carrying 36 passengers.

History

The Century of Progress Exposition committee sought an exciting signature attraction, one that would be remembered like the Eiffel Tower from the 1889 Paris World's Fair or the Ferris wheel of the 1893 Chicago World's Fair. One proposal under consideration, to be underwritten by Montgomery Ward, was called the Tower of Water and Light—a 250-foot-tall tower with water flowing down the outside and elevators traveling to observation platforms. When the Montgomery Ward company backed out of its offer to finance the tower, the commission considered the Sky Ride.

The Sky Ride, an idea suggested by an engineer named William L. Hamilton, would span the grounds and be relatively cheap to build. The ride was built in the span of six months prior to the fair's opening, by a consortium of five companies: Great Lakes Dredge and Dock Company, Inland Steel, John Roebling and Sons, Mississippi Valley Structural Steel and Otis Elevator at a cost of about $1 million.

The ride had a capacity of 5,000 people per hour. It was reported that the attraction had 2,616,389 riders in 1933 and a total of about 4.5 million during the course of the fair. At the time of construction the span between towers was one of the longest in the world, allegedly exceeded in span only by the George Washington Bridge, and the towers were higher than any of the skyscrapers in Chicago. It was reported that it contained 2,000 tons of steel,  of cabling and that the cableway had a breaking strength of 220,000 pounds per square inch.

The Sky Ride was demolished at the conclusion of the fair. The west tower was brought down using 120 pounds of dynamite. The east tower was toppled on August 29, 1935 using 1,500 pounds of thermite charges to melt ten-foot sections near the bottom of two of the legs. When the thermite was fired, the two legs collapsed and the tower fell on its side.

Design

Each tower had four elevators with a 30-person capacity. Fair goers could take a trip across from one tower to the other at the  level, or take the elevator farther up to the observation decks at the top of the tower. There were two decks per tower and Bausch and Lomb supplied the 12 coin-operated telescopes on the tower observation decks. If they chose to take a trip across, they rode in one of 12 double-decked "rocket cars" carried across from one tower to the other. Each car emitted steam intended to resemble a "tail" or rocket exhaust, as it traveled across the wires. At night, lights were focused on the cars as they traveled between the towers, and lights were also attached to the bottom of the elevators.

The transporter bridge  is more common in Europe. In the United States, only two transporter bridges were ever built: the Aerial Lift Bridge in Duluth, Minnesota in 1905, and the Sky Ride. Due to capacity constraints, the Duluth bridge was converted from a transporter bridge to a more conventional vertical lift bridge with a raisable through truss span in 1930. Thus, the count of transporter bridges existing at a given time in the US never exceeded 1, and after November 1934, stands at zero again.

Brochure
The following brochure text  gives a feel for the dramatic prose of the day.

See also
Lattice tower
Aerial tramway
Transporter bridge

Notes

References
 

 niederelbe.de Skyride information (in German)
 Earth Station 9 many facts and figures taken from this source (but corroborated at other sources)
 niederelb.de international Transporter bridge information, see also the Transporter bridge article.
 Chicago Public Library   Century of Progress materials
 www.worldfairs.info forum (in French) with some very clear pictures of the cars, cabling, towers and other details

Further reading

Kretschmer, Winfried   Geschichte der Weltausstellungen (1st edition), Campus-Verlag, Frankfurt (Germany), 1999; pp. 192.
Ratigan, William  (1959) Highways Over Broad Waters, Wm. B. Eerdmans Publishing Company; pp. 224–227. ASIN B0007IY0OC

External links
 BridgePix.com blog entry showing colored postcard view
 Library of congress panorama taken by Harry Koss; August 22, 1933.
 Library of congress panorama taken by Harry Koss; October 30, 1933.
 Postcard image from niederelbe.de
Image Search from SAIC (School of the Art Institute of Chicago)

Bridges completed in 1933
Bridges in Chicago
History of Chicago
Transporter bridges
Century of Progress
Steel bridges in the United States
Moveable bridges in the United States
1933 establishments in Illinois
1934 disestablishments in Illinois